Jean-Michel Lesage (born 1 May 1977) is a French former professional footballer who played as an attacking midfielder.

Career
Lesage was born in Bourg-la-Reine. He played as a left winger at the start of his career, but then became an attacking midfielder. As an attacker, he was the joint-highest scorer (16 goals) in Ligue 2 in the 2006–07 season, along with Steve Savidan from Valenciennes FC.

On 5 April 2017, he announced his retirement. Lesage finished his career as the record all time goal scorer for both Le Havre AC and US Creteil-Lusitanos.

Honours
 Ligue 2 Player of the Month: February 2007

References

External links
 

1977 births
Living people
People from Bourg-la-Reine
French footballers
Footballers from Hauts-de-Seine
Association football midfielders
AS Poissy players
US Créteil-Lusitanos players
Le Havre AC players
AJ Auxerre players
Ligue 1 players
Ligue 2 players
Championnat National players